The Order of the Republic is Moldova's highest order. It is awarded by the President of Moldova for exceptional merits in all fields which benefit Moldova and humanity as a whole. The order was established in July 1992 and its collar and badge are made from silver. 

A recipient cannot receive the award twice. The next (lower) award is the Order of Ștefan cel Mare.

Recipients

Moldovan 
 Grigorii Zapuhlih
 Silviu Berejan
 Vladimir Beşleagă
 Valeriu Boboc
 Ivan Bodiul – Former Leader of Soviet Moldova
 Petru Bogatu
 Lorena Bogza
 Timofei Moșneaga – Former Minister of Health of Moldova 
 Vasile Botnaru
 Val Butnaru
 Mihai Cimpoi
 Dumitru Ciubaşenco
 Nicolae Dabija
 Ion Druţă
 Corina Fusu
 Anatolie Golea
 Zinaida Greceanîi
 Aneta Grosu
 Ion Hadârcă
 Petru Lucinschi – Former president of Moldova 
 Nicolae Mătcaş
 Victor Puşcaş
 Sergiu Rădăuţan
 Gheorghe Rusnac
 Valeriu Saharneanu
 Ludmila Scalnai
 Vitalie Scalnai
 Mircea Snegur – The first President of Moldova
 Andrei Strâmbeanu
 Nicolae Sulac
 Constantin Tănase (journalist)
 Vasile Tarlev
 Victor Teleucă
 Doina Aldea Teodorovici
 Ion Aldea Teodorovici
 Serafim Urechean
 Valentina Ursu
 Grigore Vieru
 Mihai Volontir
 Veaceslav Iordan
 Elena Zamura
 Aurelian Silvestru
 Pavel Cebanu – president of Moldovan Football Federation
 Veaceslav Untilă  – President of Court of Accounts (Moldova)
 Ion Madan – former member of the Parliament of Moldova

Foreign 
 Alexy II of Moscow
 Traian Băsescu – Former president of Romania 
 Süleyman Demirel – The 9th President of Turkey
 Leonid Kuchma – Former president of Ukraine 
 Gurbanguly Berdimuhamedow – Former president of Turkmenistan
 Rosen Plevneliev – Former president of Bulgaria
 Angela Merkel – Former Chancellor of Germany
 Klaus Iohannis – President of Romania
 Sofia Rotaru
 Dalia Grybauskaitė – Former president of Republic of Lithuania
 Dacian Cioloș – Former Prime Minister of Romania
 Victor Ponta – Former Prime Minister of Romania
 Recep Tayyip Erdoğan – President of Turkey
 Tudor Gheorghe – Romanian musician

Sources 
 Lege Nr. 1123 din 30.07.1992 cu privire la distincțiile de stat ale Republicii Moldova (English:Law Nr. 1123 of 30.07.1992 on state awards of the Republic of Moldova)

References

External links 
  Preşedinţia Republicii Moldova

 
Politics of Moldova
Republic, Order
National symbols of Moldova
1992 establishments in Moldova
Awards established in 1992